Christopher P. DePhillips (born March 30, 1965) is an American Republican Party politician who has represented the 40th Legislative District in the New Jersey General Assembly since 2018. He replaced David C. Russo, who decided against running for re-election after 28 years in office. DePhillips had previously served as mayor of Wyckoff.

Personal and early life 
DePhillips earned a Bachelor of Arts degree with a major in government from Georgetown University in 1987 and a Juris Doctor degree from Seton Hall University School of Law in 1992. From 1987 to 1989 he worked in Washington, D.C., as an aide to Congresswoman Marge Roukema. A practicing attorney, DePhillips is vice president and general counsel of Porzio Life Sciences. A member of the Wyckoff Township Committee from 2010 to 2013, DePhillips was unanimously chosen by his peers to serve as the township's mayor in 2012. Appointed in June 2012, he served until 2017 as a Commissioner of the Northwest Bergen County Utilities Authority, which provides sewage treatment services to 75,000 residents in Bergen County.

New Jersey Assembly

Tenure 
DePhillips was sworn in on January 9, 2018.

In February 2019, DePhillips introduced a bill that would abolish New Jersey Schools Development Authority, but it never came to a vote in Committee.

In June 2021, DePhillips was appointed to GOP caucus leadership, being named deputy Republican leader by NJ Assembly Republican leader Jon Bramnick.

On December 6, 2021, DePhillips introduced a bill that would allow vote-by-mail ballots to be counted as they are received, which would change the current policy that requires waiting until election day. In an NJ Assembly GOP press release promoting the bill, Dephillips stated that, “It is incumbent upon officials to fix the problems that lead to conspiracy theories. Earlier counting of mail-in votes will help address some of this year’s hang-ups,” referencing how, in 2021, New Jersey's gubernatorial race and some legislative races were too close to call on election night.

In March 2022, DePhillips introduced proposed articles of impeachment against New Jersey Secretary of Labor Robert Asaro-Angelo.

Committee assignments 
Financial Institutions and Insurance
Judiciary
Science, Innovation and Technology

District 40 
Each of the 40 districts in the New Jersey Legislature has one representative in the New Jersey Senate and two members in the New Jersey General Assembly. The representatives from the 40th District for the 2022—23 Legislative Session are:
 Senator Kristin Corrado (R)
 Assemblyman Christopher DePhillips (R)
 Assemblyman Kevin J. Rooney (R)

Electoral history

New Jersey Assembly

2019 
In 2019, Democrats Maria Martini Cordonnier and Micheal Sedon won the primary to challenge DePhillips and his running mate Kevin J. Rooney. However, Sedon dropped out of the general election and was replaced with former Bergen County Freeholder Julie O'Brien. During the election DePhillips and Rooney skipped a debate hosted by the League of Women Voters, claiming it was unfair. The Democrats lost to the incumbents.

2017 
In the 2013 general election, the last time all three legislative seats in the 40th District were up for vote simultaneously, the winners were Kevin J. O'Toole in the Senate and Scott Rumana and David C. Russo in the Assembly. By the 2017 primaries all would be gone, with O'Toole resigning in 2017 to become a Commissioner of the Port Authority of New York and New Jersey (being replaced by Kristin Corrado), Rumana leaving in 2016 to become a Superior Court Judge (and be replaced By Kevin J. Rooney) and Russo's announcement that he would not run for another term of office, leaving a vacuum that led to a series of primary challenges. In the June 2017 Republican primary for the two Assembly seats, Rooney and DePhillips withstood a challenge from Joseph Bubba Jr. and the comeback attempt of former State Senator Norman M. Robertson by margins of 2–1; Kristin Corrado won the Senate nomination against former Assemblyman Paul DiGaetano. Since 1973, the 40th District has always leaned Republican, never electing a Democrat through the 2017 general election. However, a poll conducted by Democrats shortly before the election showed the two slates tied at 39%, with 21% of voters undecided. In the November 2017 general election, DePhillips (with 30,610 votes; 26.3% of all ballots cast) and his running mate, incumbent Kevin J. Rooney (with 31,170; 26.8%), defeated Democratic challengers Christine Ordway (27,092; 23.3%) and Paul Vagianos (26,737; 23.0%) to win both Assembly seats from the district for the Republicans.

References

1965 births
Living people
Mayors of places in New Jersey
New Jersey lawyers
Republican Party members of the New Jersey General Assembly
People from Wyckoff, New Jersey
Politicians from Bergen County, New Jersey
Georgetown College (Georgetown University) alumni
Seton Hall University School of Law alumni
21st-century American politicians